The Saint Adalbert Roman Catholic Church is a Roman Catholic church  at 52-29 83rd Street in Elmhurst, Queens, New York. It was founded in November 1892 primarily to serve immigrants from Poland who settled in the areas of Elmhurst, Maspeth and neighboring villages.

History

The Church 
The first parishioners of the church were initially served by priests who are speakers of the Polish language and of priests of Polish descent since 1891. The first was Father Joseph Fyda. Father Fyda was succeeded by Reverend Monsignor Boleslaus Puchalski. Other priests who served the church included Reverend Doctor Adalbert Nawrocki and Monsignor Wiadyslaw Manka. The parish was transferred to the management of Franciscan Friars Minor Conventual in 1906.   It still has staff who speak Polish despite of its diverse parishioners at present.

The church's current structure was built in 1947.

The School 
There is also St. Adalbert Catholic Academy, which was established in 1892 and was also run by the church, until it was taken over by the Diocese of Brooklyn and became a Catholic Academy.

See also
Holy Cross Roman Catholic Church (Maspeth, New York)
Our Lady of the Miraculous Medal Church
Transfiguration Roman Catholic Church

References list

External links

Saint Adalbert Catholic Academy

Roman Catholic churches in Queens, New York
Elmhurst, Queens
Polish-American culture in New York City
1892 establishments in New York (state)
Religious organizations established in 1892